The Sea to Sea Green Blue Belt is a 62 kilometre (39 mi) long greenbelt surrounding the Greater Victoria metropolitan area in Canada. The greenbelt includes green space, forests, farms, and wetlands stretching from Sooke to Salt Spring Island. It also includes the "blue spaces" of Sooke Basin and Saanich Inlet.

Geography
Protected areas contained within the greenbelt include:

Burgoyne Bay Provincial Park
Butchart Gardens
East Sooke Regional Park
Goldstream Provincial Park
Gowlland Tod Provincial Park
Mount Maxwell Provincial Park
Mount Wells Regional Park
Mount Work Regional Park
Sea to Sky Regional Park
Sooke Mountain Provincial Park
Sooke Potholes Provincial Park
Sooke Potholes Regional Park

See also
Ottawa Greenbelt

References

Capital Regional District
Protected areas of British Columbia
Green belts
Geography of Vancouver Island